The 1976 Tournament Players Championship was a golf tournament in Florida on the PGA Tour, held February 26 to March 1 at Inverrary Country Club in Lauderhill, northwest of Fort Lauderdale. This was the third Tournament Players Championship; Jack Nicklaus won his second title, three strokes ahead of runner-up J. C. Snead, similar to his 1974 win.

Saturday was washed out by a thunderstorm; the third round was on Sunday and the final round on Monday.

Defending champion Al Geiberger finished fifteen strokes back, in a tie for 24th place.

The first two editions had been played in late summer, after the major championships; this year's began in late February.

Venue
This was the only Tournament Players Championship held in south Florida; the first was in Georgia and the second in Texas. It relocated to northeast Florida at Ponte Vedra Beach in 1977. Inverrary hosted an annual event on the PGA Tour from 1972 through 1983, which was not played in 1976.

Past champions in the field 

Source:

Round summaries

First round
Thursday, February 26, 1976
Friday, February 27, 1976

Source:

Second round
Friday, February 27, 1976

Source:

Third round
Saturday, February 28, 1976
Sunday, February 29, 1976

Source:

Final round
Monday, March 1, 1976

Source:

References

External links
The Players Championship website
Inverrary Country Club

1976
1976 in golf
1976 in American sports
1976 in sports in Florida
February 1976 sports events in the United States
March 1976 sports events in the United States